Lodoletta is a dramma lirico or lyric opera in three acts by Pietro Mascagni. The libretto is by Giovacchino Forzano, and is based on the novel Two Little Wooden Shoes by Ouida (pseudonym of Marie Louise de la Ramée).

It was first performed at the Teatro Costanzi in Rome on 30 April 1917 with Rosina Storchio in the title role. The American premiere was on 12 January 1918 at the Metropolitan Opera, New York City, with Geraldine Farrar as Lodoletta and Enrico Caruso as Flammen.

Roles

The opera is set in 1853 in Holland.

References

External links

Libretto (in Italian)

Italian-language operas
Operas by Pietro Mascagni
Operas
1917 operas
Operas based on novels
Operas set in the Netherlands
Operas set in the 19th century